Broken Badges is an American-Canadian police procedural drama television series that aired on CBS from November 24, 1990, to December 22, 1990, and on June 20, 1991. The series was co-created by Stephen J. Cannell.

Premise
Broken Badges followed three police officers, J.J "Bullet" Tingreedes, who was addicted to danger, Stanley "Whipusall" Jones, a small man who would explode when people would make comments about his size, and Toby Baker, a kleptomaniac. All were on psychiatric leave from the police department. Together, with former New Orleans cop Beau Jack Bowman and police psychiatrist Priscilla Mather, they formed a crime fighting team.

Cast
 Miguel Ferrer as Beau Jack Bowman
 Eileen Davidson as J.J "Bullet" Tingreedes
 Jay Johnson as Stanley "Whipusall" Jones
 Ernie Hudson as Toby Baker
 Charlotte Lewis as Priscilla Mathers

Episodes

Broadcast 
This show debuted on CBS on November 24, 1990, replacing E.A.R.T.H. Force, this was done as part of a realignment in CBS' programming lineup that involves other programming. It did not fare well in the ratings, and it was quietly cancelled later that year.

Home media
On July 27, 2010, Mill Creek Entertainment released Prime Time Crime: The Stephen J. Cannell Collection on DVD in Region 1.  This special collection contained 54 episodes from 13 different shows produced by Stephen J. Cannell Productions including all seven episodes of Broken Badges.

References

External links

1990 American television series debuts
1991 American television series endings
1990 Canadian television series debuts
1991 Canadian television series endings
Television series by 20th Century Fox Television
Television series by Stephen J. Cannell Productions
CBS original programming
1990s American drama television series
1990s Canadian drama television series
English-language television shows
Television shows filmed in Vancouver